Geometric buckling is a measure of neutron leakage and material buckling is a measure of the difference between neutron production and neutron absorption. When nuclear fission occurs inside of a nuclear reactor, neutrons are produced. These neutrons then, to state it simply, either react with the fuel in the reactor or escape from the reactor. These two processes are referred to as neutron absorption and neutron leakage, and their sum is the neutron loss. When the rate of neutron production is equal to the rate of neutron loss, the reactor is able to sustain a chain reaction of nuclear fissions and is considered a critical reactor.

In the case of a bare, homogenous, steady-state reactor (that is, a reactor that has only one region, a homogenous mixture of fuel and coolant, no blanket nor reflector, and does not change over time), the geometric and material buckling are equal to each other.

Derivation

Both buckling terms are derived from the particular diffusion equation which is valid for neutrons:

.

where k is the criticality eigenvalue,  is the neutrons per fission,  is the macroscopic cross section for fission, and from diffusion theory, the diffusion coefficient is defined as:

.

In addition, the diffusion length is defined as:

.

Rearranging the terms, the diffusion equation becomes:

.

The left side is the material buckling and the right side of the equation is the geometric buckling.

Geometric Buckling 

The geometric buckling is a simple Helmholtz eigenvalue problem that is simply solved for different geometries. 
The table below lists the geometric buckling for some common geometries.

Since the diffusion theory calculations overpredict the critical dimensions, an extrapolation distance δ must be subtracted to obtain an estimate of actual values.  The buckling could also be calculated using actual dimensions and extrapolated distances using the following table.

Expressions for Geometric Buckling in Terms of Actual Dimensions and Extrapolated Distances.

Material Buckling 
Materials buckling is the buckling of a homogeneous configuration with respect to material properties only.  If we redefine  in terms of purely material properties (and assume the fundamental mode), we have:

.

As stated previously, the geometric buckling is defined as:

.

Solving for k (in the fundamental mode),

;

thus,

.

Assuming the reactor is in a critical state (k = 1),

.

This expression is in purely material properties; therefore, this is called the materials buckling:

.

Critical Reactor Dimensions 
By equating the geometric and material buckling, one can determine the critical dimensions of a one region nuclear reactor.

References

Nuclear technology